San Gioacchino ai Prati Castello ("St Joachim's at the Fields of the Castle") is a church in Rome dedicated to Saint Joachim, the father of Mary, mother of Jesus. Construction began in 1891 and the building was opened to the public in 1898. It was consecrated on 6 June 1911 by Cardinal Pietro Respighi. Pope John XXIII made it a cardinal's titular church in 1960.

List of Cardinal-Protectors
Bernard Alfrink (1960–1987) 
Michele Giordano (1988–2010)
Leopoldo Brenes (2014–present)

Gioacchino Prati
Roman Catholic churches completed in 1898
Gioacchino Prati
1898 establishments in Italy
Gioacchino